Indi Script Records is an independent record label founded in 1999 by Mateus Kotok, a singer, songwriter, composer, producer, multi-instrumentalist, and painter born in Ogden, Utah, in 1971.

Based in Maui, Hawaii, and Seattle, Washington, Kotok has produced music for a wide variety of performers. His first solo album, Indi Script, came out in 2003.

Kotok's alternative band Mindspice released a self-titled CD in Seattle in 1992.

See also
 List of record labels

External links
 Indi Script Records

Record labels established in 1999
American independent record labels
Alternative rock record labels
1999 establishments in the United States